Khonjesht (also known as Khongesht, Khongshet, and Khūngesht) is a village in Khonjesht Rural District, in the Central District of Eqlid County, Fars Province, Iran. At the 2006 census, its population was 2,576, in 700 families. The village is the main settlement of the Kurdish Kordshuli tribe.

References 

Populated places in Eqlid County

Kurdish settlements in Iran